New York’s 5th congressional district is a congressional district for the United States House of Representatives, represented by Democrat Gregory Meeks. The district is located in Queens. A plurality of the district's population is African-American, and a majority of the district's population is non-white.

The district includes the entire Rockaway Peninsula as well as the Queens neighborhoods of Broad Channel, Cambria Heights, Hollis, Howard Beach, Jamaica, Kew Gardens, Laurelton, Queens Village, Richmond Hill, Rosedale, Saint Albans, Springfield Gardens, and South Ozone Park, as well as John F. Kennedy International Airport.

Voting

History
1789–1913:
Parts of Manhattan
1913–45:
Parts of Brooklyn
1945–63:
Parts of Queens
1963–93:
Parts of Nassau
1993–2003:
Parts of Nassau, Queens, Suffolk
2003–2023:
Parts of Nassau, Queens
2023—:
Parts of Queens

Various New York districts have been numbered "5" over the years, including areas in New York City and various parts of upstate New York. From 2003–13, the district consisted of northeastern Queens County and northwestern Nassau County.  The Queens portion of the district included the neighborhoods of Bayside, Corona, Douglaston, Flushing, Jamaica Estates, Little Neck, and Whitestone.  The Nassau portion of the district included Albertson, Great Neck, Manhasset, Port Washington, Roslyn, and Sands Point.

List of members representing the district 

Prior to 1992 the 5th District was centered on the south shore of Nassau County including towns mostly now in the 3rd and 4th District. The Queens portions of the 5th had been previously primarily in the 8th District of the 1980s. In general, the present 5th District greatly mirrors the 6th District from 1972 to 1982. The 1990s version of this district included northeast Nassau and northwest Suffolk counties; these areas were placed in the 2nd and 3rd District in 2002 and the 5th District gained areas in Queens formerly in the 18th District.

Election results

Note that in New York State electoral politics there are numerous minor parties at various points on the political spectrum. Certain parties normally endorse either the Republican or Democratic candidate for every office, hence the state electoral results contain both the party votes, and the final candidate votes (Listed as "Recap").

Historical district boundaries

See also

 List of United States congressional districts
 New York's congressional districts
 United States congressional delegations from New York

Notes

References
 
 
 Congressional Biographical Directory of the United States 1774–present
 2004 House election data Clerk of the House of Representatives
 2002 House election data "
 2000 House election data "
 1998 House election data "
 1996 House election data "

05
Constituencies established in 1789
1789 establishments in New York (state)